Casartelli is an Italian surname. Notable people with the surname include:

Carlos Casartelli (born 1974), Argentine footballer
Fabio Casartelli (1970–1995), Italian cyclist
Fernando Casartelli (born 1976), Argentine footballer
Francesco Casartelli (1899–?), Italian footballer who played in Internazionale from 1923 to 1926
Louis Charles Casartelli (1852–1925), fourth Bishop of Salford
Victorio Casartelli (born 1922), Uruguayan politician

See also
Casartelli Building

Italian-language surnames